The Ocqueoc Falls Highway–Ocqueoc River Bridge is a highway bridge located on the Ocqueoc Falls Highway over Ocqueoc River in Ocqueoc Township, Michigan.  It was listed on the National Register of Historic Places in 1999. It is significant as a well-preserved early example of concrete arch bridges constructed by the Michigan State Highway Department.

History
Soon after, a trunkline route across Presque Isle County was designated, with most of the road improvements completed by 1915. However, it was not until 1919 that the Michigan State Highway Department began work on designing this bridge, designated Trunk Line Bridge No. 253. Bids were solicited, and eventually Rogers City contractor John Decker was awarded an $8,849 contract to construct this bridge. Work was completed in 1920.

This section of the trunkline was later incorporated into US-23 and M-68.  In 1954, the main highway was rerouted over another bridge, but this one continued to carry local traffic.

Description
The structure of the bridge is as a  filled spandrel arch with an elliptical profile sitting on concrete abutments. The ring arch is corbelled and the concrete guardrails include panels. Bronze plates reading "Trunk Line Bridge" are mounted inside the guardrail walls. The structure is somewhat deteriorated, but remains in unaltered condition.

References

External links
Photos from HistoricBridges.org

Road bridges on the National Register of Historic Places in Michigan
Bridges completed in 1920
Buildings and structures in Presque Isle County, Michigan
National Register of Historic Places in Presque Isle County, Michigan
Arch bridges in the United States
Concrete bridges in the United States
1920 establishments in Michigan